Pertusaria is a large genus of crustose lichens in the family Pertusariaceae. A 2008 estimate placed 500 species in the genus.

A

Pertusaria aberrans 
Pertusaria aceroae 
Pertusaria albiglobosa 
Pertusaria albineoides 
Pertusaria alboaspera 
Pertusaria albula 
Pertusaria alectoronica 
Pertusaria allanii  – New Zealand
Pertusaria allogibberosa  – Papua New Guinea
Pertusaria alloisidiosa 
Pertusaria allolutea 
Pertusaria alloluteola  – Australia
Pertusaria allomicrostoma  – Thailand
Pertusaria allosorodes  – New Zealand
Pertusaria allothwaitesii  – Thailand
Pertusaria amarescens 
Pertusaria ambigua  – Australia
Pertusaria amblyogona 
Pertusaria amnicola 
Pertusaria aphelospora 
Pertusaria appalachensis 
Pertusaria angabangensis  – Papua New Guinea
Pertusaria aptrootii  – Papua New Guinea
Pertusaria aquilonia 
Pertusaria archerii  – Thailand
Pertusaria athrocarpa 
Pertusaria atroguttata 
Pertusaria atromaculata 
Pertusaria atrospilota  – Papua New Guinea
Pertusaria azulensis

B
Pertusaria bagoensis   – New South Wales
Pertusaria balekensis   – Papua New Guinea
Pertusaria barbatica 
Pertusaria bogia  – Papua New Guinea
Pertusaria bokluensis  – Thailand
Pertusaria borealis 
Pertusaria boweniana 
Pertusaria brattiae 
Pertusaria bryontha 
Pertusaria bundiensis  – Papua New Guinea

C

Pertusaria calderae 
Pertusaria californica 
Pertusaria carneopallida 
Pertusaria cerebrinula 
Pertusaria cerroazulensis 
Pertusaria ceylonica 
Pertusaria chiodectonoides 
Pertusaria cicatricosa 
Pertusaria cisalbescens 
Pertusaria clercii 
Pertusaria coccodes 
Pertusaria complanata 
Pertusaria confluentica  – Australia and Thailand
Pertusaria coniophorella 
Pertusaria consanguinea 
Pertusaria consocians 
Pertusaria conspersa 
Pertusaria constricta 
Pertusaria copiofructa 
Pertusaria coronata 
Pertusaria cryptostoma 
Pertusaria cyatheicola

D
Pertusaria darwiniana 
Pertusaria dayi 
Pertusaria dealbescens 
Pertusaria dehiscens 
Pertusaria dennistonensis 
Pertusaria depressa 
Pertusaria dharugensis 
Pertusaria dissita 
Pertusaria doradorensis

E

Pertusaria elixii  – Thailand
Pertusaria elizabethae  – Brazil
Pertusaria elliptica 
Pertusaria endoxantha 
Pertusaria epacrospora 
Pertusaria epitheciifera 
Pertusaria errinundrensis 
Pertusaria etayoi 
Pertusaria ewersii

F
Pertusaria ferax 
Pertusaria fernandeziana 
Pertusaria flavicans 
Pertusaria flavicunda 
Pertusaria flavida 
Pertusaria flavocorallina 
Pertusaria flavoexpansa 
Pertusaria flavoisidiata 
Pertusaria flavopunctata  – Australia
Pertusaria flindersiana 
Pertusaria follmanniana 
Pertusaria fosseyae  – Democratic Republic of Congo

G
Pertusaria gadgarrensis 
Pertusaria galapagoensis 
Pertusaria georgeana 
Pertusaria glabra 
Pertusaria glaucomela 
Pertusaria glebulosa 
Pertusaria globospora 
Pertusaria glomelliferica  – Australia
Pertusaria glomerata 
Pertusaria glomulifera 
Pertusaria granulata 
Pertusaria grassiae 
Pertusaria guineabissauensis 
Pertusaria gundermanica 
Pertusaria gymnospora

H
Pertusaria hadrocarpa  
Pertusaria hartmannii  
Pertusaria havaiiensis 
Pertusaria heinarii 
Pertusaria hermaka 
Pertusaria hiatensis 
Pertusaria homilocarpa 
Pertusaria hossei 
Pertusaria huneckiana 
Pertusaria huanicola 
Pertusaria humilis  – Australia
Pertusaria hutchinsiae 
Pertusaria hylocola 
Pertusaria hymenea 
Pertusaria hypoprotocetrarica  – Papua New Guinea
Pertusaria hypostictica  – Thailand
Pertusaria hypoxantha

I
Pertusaria inconspicua  – Papua New Guinea
Pertusaria injuneana 
Pertusaria inopinata 
Pertusaria insularicola 
Pertusaria inthanonensis  – Thailand
Pertusaria irregularis 
Pertusaria isidiosa 
Pertusaria islandica

J
Pertusaria jogyeensis 
Pertusaria jurana

K
Pertusaria kansriae  – Thailand
Pertusaria karkarensis  – Papua New Guinea
Pertusaria kinigiensis  – Rwanda
Pertusaria knightiana 
Pertusaria krabiensis  – Thailand
Pertusaria krogiae  – Rwanda

L

Pertusaria labuensis 
Pertusaria lacerans 
Pertusaria lactescens 
Pertusaria laeana  – Papua New Guinea
Pertusaria lambinonii  – Democratic Republic of Congo
Pertusaria lansangensis  – Thailand
Pertusaria lavata 
Pertusaria lecanina 
Pertusaria leiocarpella 
Pertusaria leioplaca 
Pertusaria leioplacella 
Pertusaria leptocarpa 
Pertusaria lueckingii  – Galápagos Islands
Pertusaria leucophaea  – Australia
Pertusaria leucoplaca 
Pertusaria leucostigma 
Pertusaria leucostomoides 
Pertusaria leucothelia 
Pertusaria lichexanthofarinosa 
Pertusaria lichexanthoimmersa 
Pertusaria lichexanthoverrucosa 
Pertusaria limbata 
Pertusaria litchiicola 
Pertusaria loeiensis  – Thailand
Pertusaria lophocarpa 
Pertusaria lordhowensis 
Pertusaria lueckingii 
Pertusaria lumbschii 
Pertusaria luteola

M

Pertusaria macra 
Pertusaria macroides 
Pertusaria maculiformis 
Pertusaria malabara 
Pertusaria malmei 
Pertusaria malvinae 
Pertusaria manamensis  – Papua New Guinea
Pertusaria mankiensis 
Pertusaria marcellii 
Pertusaria mariae 
Pertusaria maritima 
Pertusaria mattogrossensis 
Pertusaria mccroryae 
Pertusaria medullamarilla 
Pertusaria megacarpa 
Pertusaria meeana 
Pertusaria melaleucoides 
Pertusaria melanospora 
Pertusaria melanostoma 
Pertusaria mesotropa 
Pertusaria methylstenosporica]  – Thailand
Pertusaria microstoma 
Pertusaria miscella 
Pertusaria minispora 
Pertusaria modesta Müll.Arg. (1884)}}
Pertusaria montoensis 
Pertusaria montana 
Pertusaria montpittensis] 
Pertusaria moreliensis 
Pertusaria myola  – Papua New Guinea

N
Pertusaria naduriensis  – Papua New Guinea
Pertusaria nahaeoensis  – Thailand
Pertusaria nanensis  – Thailand
Pertusaria nebulosa 
Pertusaria neoknightiana  – Thailand
Pertusaria neolecanina 
Pertusaria neotriconica 
Pertusaria nerrigensis 
Pertusaria norfolkensis 
Pertusaria novae-guineae  – Papua New Guinea
Pertusaria novae-hollandiae

O
Pertusaria oblongata 
Pertusaria occidentalis 
Pertusaria ochrodigitula 
Pertusaria oculae-ranae 
Pertusaria oculata 
Pertusaria omkoiensis  – Thailand
Pertusaria orarensis 
Pertusaria orientalis  – Thailand

P

Pertusaria pachythallina 
Pertusaria pallida 
Pertusaria palumaensis 
Pertusaria papillulata 
Pertusaria papuana  – Papua New Guinea
Pertusaria paradoxica 
Pertusaria parameeana  – Thailand
Pertusaria paramerae 
Pertusaria parapycnothelia 
Pertusaria paraqilianensis  – Qinghai (China)
Pertusaria paratropa 
Pertusaria paratropica 
Pertusaria paratuberculifera 
Pertusaria parmatica  – Papua New Guinea
Pertusaria patellifera 
Pertusaria perrimosa 
Pertusaria perthwaitesii  – Papua New Guinea
Pertusaria pertractata 
Pertusaria pertusa 
Pertusaria pertusella 
Pertusaria petrophyes 
Pertusaria phlyctaenula 
Pertusaria phulhuangensis  – Thailand
Pertusaria phusoidaoensis  – Thailand
Pertusaria pilosula 
Pertusaria pinnaculata 
Pertusaria placocarpa 
Pertusaria planaica 
Pertusaria platycarpa  – Thailand
Pertusaria pluripuncta 
Pertusaria polythecia 
Pertusaria porinella 
Pertusaria praecipua  – Papua New Guinea
Pertusaria praetermissa 
Pertusaria pseudococcodes 
Pertusaria pseudocorallina 
Pertusaria pseudoculata 
Pertusaria pseudomelanospora 
Pertusaria pseudoparotica 
Pertusaria pseudothwaitesii 
Pertusaria puffina 
Pertusaria pupillaris 
Pertusaria pustulata 
Pertusaria puttyensis 
Pertusaria pycnothelia

Q
Pertusaria qilianensis  – Qinghai (China)
Pertusaria qinbaensis 
Pertusaria quadraginta 
Pertusaria queenslandica  – Australia

R
Pertusaria ramuensis  – Papua New Guinea
Pertusaria rarotongensis 
Pertusaria remota 
Pertusaria rhexostoma 
Pertusaria rigida 
Pertusaria roccellica 
Pertusaria rogersii 
Pertusaria roseola  – Australia
Pertusaria rubefacta 
Pertusaria rupicola

S
Pertusaria salacinifera 
Pertusaria salax 
Pertusaria salazinica 
Pertusaria salebrosa 
Pertusaria saltuensis 
Pertusaria saxatilis 
Pertusaria saximontana 
Pertusaria scabrida 
Pertusaria sejilaensis 
Pertusaria siamensis  – Thailand
Pertusaria simoneana 
Pertusaria sipmanii  – Papua New Guinea
Pertusaria sommerfeltii 
Pertusaria southlandica 
Pertusaria spegazzinii 
Pertusaria stellata 
Pertusaria stenhammerii 
Pertusaria stenospora 
Pertusaria stictica 
Pertusaria subambigens 
Pertusaria subarida 
Pertusaria subcerussata 
Pertusaria subcopelandii  – Thailand
Pertusaria subisidiosa 
Pertusaria submalvinae  – Australia
Pertusaria submaritima 
Pertusaria suboculata 
Pertusaria subplanaica 
Pertusaria subradians 
Pertusaria subrigida 
Pertusaria subviolacea 
Pertusaria superiana 
Pertusaria sydneyensis

T

Pertusaria taibaiensis 
Pertusaria takensis  – Thailand
Pertusaria tejocotensis 
Pertusaria ternata 
Pertusaria tetrathalamia 
Pertusaria texana 
Pertusaria thailandica  – Thailand
Pertusaria thioisidiata 
Pertusaria thiophaninica 
Pertusaria thiospoda 
Pertusaria thula 
Pertusaria thwaitesii 
Pertusaria tjaetabensis 
Pertusaria trachyspora 
Pertusaria trevethensis 
Pertusaria trimera

U
Pertusaria undulata 
Pertusaria uttaraditensis  – Thailand

V
Pertusaria valliculata 
Pertusaria variabilis  – Australia
Pertusaria verdonii 
Pertusaria verruculifera 
Pertusaria vulpina

W
Pertusaria wallingatensis 
Pertusaria wenxianensis 
Pertusaria werneriana 
Pertusaria wilsoniana 
Pertusaria wirthii  – New Zealand
Pertusaria wui 
Pertusaria wulfenioides

X
Pertusaria xanthodactylina 
Pertusaria xanthodes 
Pertusaria xanthoisidiata 
Pertusaria xantholeucoides 
Pertusaria xanthonaria 
Pertusaria xanthoplaca 
Pertusaria xanthosorediata 
Pertusaria xenismota 
Pertusaria xylophyes

Y
Pertusaria yulongensis 
Pertusaria yunnana 
Pertusaria yupna  – Papua New Guinea

External links

References

Pertusaria